Martín Zapater y Clavería (12 November 1747, Zaragoza - 1803, Zaragoza) was a wealthy Aragonese merchant, with an enlightenment point of view. He is largely known for his close friendship with the famous artist, Francisco Goya. The letters they exchanged constitute one of the primary sources of knowledge about Goya's life.

Biography 
As a member of the growing bourgeoisie of the eighteenth century, he amassed a significant fortune from his land sales and leasing to the City of Zaragoza, other institutions, and the local nobility. In 1778, he was appointed  for the city and, the following year, became a member of the Aragonese nobility himself, by order of King Charles IV.

He was an initiator for many of the Enlightenment-related institutions in Aragon; being a co-founder of the Sociedad Económica de Amigos del País in 1776 and serving as their Treasurer from 1790 to 1800. He also gave grants and stipends to numerous promising students; enabling them to study architecture and engraving in Madrid.

His friendship with Goya apparently dates from their youth, when they studied together, although some historians have questioned this. In any event, they were known to have been close friends at the time of Goya's wedding, in 1773. His collection of letters passed to his grand-nephew, Francisco Zapater y Gómez, who published some of them and wrote a short biography of Goya.

Further reading 
Francisco de Goya, Cartas a Martín Zapater (letters), Mercedes Águeda and Xavier de Salas (Eds.), Tres Cantos, Istmo, 2003. .

External links 
"Martín Zapater" @ the Gran Enciclopedia Aragonesa

1747 births
1803 deaths
Spanish merchants
Spanish philanthropists
People from Zaragoza
18th-century philanthropists
18th-century Spanish businesspeople